John Alexander Wright Kirk (2 December 1888 — 21 October 1961) was a Scottish first-class cricketer.

Kirk was born at Coatbridge in December 1888. He was educated at Uddingston Grammar School. A club cricketer for Uddingston, he made his debut for Scotland in first-class cricket against Ireland at Edinburgh in 1920. He made two further first-class appearances against Ireland at Glasgow in 1922 and Dublin in 1923. Playing as a right-arm medium pace bowler, he took 11 wickets at an average of 31.36, with best figures of 4 for 80. As a lower order batsman, he scored 15 runs with a highest score of 11. Kirk died at Coatbridge in October 1961.

References

External links
 

1888 births
1961 deaths
Sportspeople from Coatbridge
People educated at Uddingston Grammar School
Scottish cricketers